iDreamBooks.com was a book "discoverability" website, structured as a book review aggregator. It was founded in San Francisco by Rahul Simha, Vish Chapalamadugu and Mohit Aggarwal in July 2012. The site is inspired by the film review aggregator website Rotten Tomatoes, whose co-founder Patrick Lee was an early investor in the venture.

Similarly to the Rotten Tomatoes system, iDreamBooks.com assigns two percentage scores to each title: one is based on professional reviews from reputable publications (including, among many others, The New Yorker, The Guardian, The Wall Street Journal, The New York Review of Books, The Independent, The Millions, The Sydney Morning Herald, etc.) as well as from writers who were vetted by the website and allowed to submit reviews; the other score is obtained from consumer user ratings.  Thus far, the site scores new releases from the big six publishers (Hachette, HarperCollins, Macmillan, Penguin, Random House, and Simon & Schuster), but in the future, it plans to include also the smaller publishers and classics. Revenue is generated from paid partnerships, of which the first one was the Sony Reader store partnership; the site also licenses its data, and, in the future, plans to offer marketing deals for individual authors or groups of books.

See also
 Goodreads
 Rotten Tomatoes
 Review aggregator

Notes and references 

Recommender systems
Internet properties established in 2012
Book review websites
500 Startups companies
American review websites